Ahamus gangcaensis is a species of moth of the family Hepialidae. It is found in China.

References 

Hepialidae
Moths described in 2004
Moths of Asia